Clarence McCoombe (23 February 1904 – 6 September 1955) was an Australian cricketer. He played in five first-class matches for Queensland in 1928/29.

See also
 List of Queensland first-class cricketers

References

External links
 

1904 births
1955 deaths
Australian cricketers
Queensland cricketers
Cricketers from Queensland